The Lusofonia Games is a multinational multi-sport event organized by the ACOLOP, which involves athletes coming from Lusophone (Portuguese-speaking) countries. Most countries competing are countries that are members of the CPLP (Community of Portuguese Language Countries), but some are countries with significant Portuguese communities or have a history with Portugal.

Participating countries are founding members Angola, Brazil, Cape Verde, East Timor, Guinea-Bissau, Macau (Chinese SAR), Mozambique, Portugal and São Tomé and Príncipe, and associate members Equatorial Guinea, India and Sri Lanka. In addition, Ghana, Flores (an island of Indonesia), Mauritius and Morocco have also expressed the desire to participate in future events.

This event is similar in concept to the Commonwealth Games (for members of the Commonwealth of Nations) and the Jeux de la Francophonie (for the Francophone community).

Editions

The 2017 Games were awarded to Mozambique. However, as of November 2017, they had not taken place.  A delegation from CPLP met with officials in São Tomé and Príncipe about holding the Games there in July 2018.

Inaugural edition

The 1st Lusofonia Games were hosted by Macau, from 7 to 15 October 2006, comprising 733 athletes from 11 countries (Equatorial Guinea did not field any athletes), some of which are international sports stars.

In competition were a total of 48 events distributed between 8 sports: athletics, basketball, beach volleyball, football, futsal, table tennis, taekwondo, volleyball. Portugal and Brazil were the top medal collectors of the Games, managing to grab 85% of the titles. These two countries acquired 71% of the total medals of the Games. All delegations won medals.

List of countries/territories

Countries that have participated

All-time medal table

Sports

So far there are not any regulations concerning the list of sports that should be included in the Games schedule. The sports chosen for the 1st edition were discussed and deliberated by the ACOLOP's members on general assembly, but without any principle of future 'core' and 'rotating' sports from a list of approved ones.

However, on 14 October 2006, the president of the organizing committee for the 2009 Lusophony Games, José Vicente de Moura, mentioned the possibility of the ACOLOP proposing four or five core sports to be included on every future edition, plus the prerogative for the host country to propose three of four more to a maximum of nine sports. In 2009 edition (Lisbon) 1500 athletes participated from 12 countries. In the football tournament five U-20 national teams competed. The sport marked with an asterisk (*) means that it was a demonstration event.

 Athletics (2006-)
 Basketball (2006-)
 Beach Volleyball (2006-)
 Disabled athletics (2009-)*
 Football (men: 2006-)
 Futsal (men: 2006-2009)
 Judo (2009-)
 Swimming (scheduled for the 2017 Games, which were cancelled)
 Taekwondo (men: 2006-, women: 2009-)
 Table Tennis (2006-)
 Wushu (2014-)
 Volleyball (2006-)

See also
 ACOLOP
 CPLP Games
 Commonwealth Games
 Jeux de la Francophonie
 Mediterranean Games

References

External links
ACOLOP

 
Multi-sport events
Portuguese language
Community of Portuguese Language Countries
Recurring sporting events established in 2006
Lusophone culture
Quadrennial sporting events